Thalassiosira pseudonana is a species of marine centric diatoms. It was chosen as the first eukaryotic marine phytoplankton for whole genome sequencing. T. pseudonana was selected for this study because it is a model for diatom physiology studies, belongs to a genus widely distributed throughout the world's oceans, and has a relatively small genome at 34 mega base pairs. Scientists are researching on diatom light absorption, using the marine diatom of Thalassiosira. The diatom requires a high enough concentration of CO2 in order to utilize C4 metabolism (Clement et al. 2015).

The clone of T. pseudonana that was sequenced is CCMP 1335 and is available from the National Center for Marine Algae and Microbiota at Bigelow Laboratory for Ocean Sciences. This clone was originally collected in 1958 from Moriches Bay (Long Island, New York) and has been maintained continuously in culture.

Symbiosis 
Thalassiosira pseudonana and the heterotrophic alphaproteobacterium Ruegeria pomeroyi form a chemical symbiosis in coculture. The bacteria provide vitamin B12 to the diatoms, which in exchange provide organic nutrients to the bacteria. In the presence of the diatom, the bacteria start producing a transporter for dihydroxypropanesulfonate (DHPS), a nutrient produced by the diatom for the bacteria.

References

Further reading

Thalassiosirales
Model organisms
Species described in 1873